Llallawi (Quechua for a very big potato of singular appearance which used to be elected as a sacrificial offering for divinities, Hispanicized spelling Llallahui) is a mountain in the Andes of Peru, about  high. It is situated in the Ayacucho Region, Víctor Fajardo Province, on the border of the districts of Sarhua and Vilcanchos.

References

Mountains of Peru
Mountains of Ayacucho Region